Suck It and See is an electronic music compilation album put together by Howie B. released on his Pussyfoot record label. It was released on 18 May 1999.

Disc one
 "Love Thong" by Love T.K.O. – 6:12
 "Luv Bungalow" by Kensuke Shiina – 4:44
 "Atomic Fuck Machine" by Daddylonglegs – 4:13
 "Porno Paradise" by Roudoudou – 5:03
 "Live from the Clermont Lounge" by Tiff McGinnis (featuring Three Wheels Out) – 2:54
 "Green Door" by Fantastic Plastic Machine – 5:39
 "(Take Your Pants Off &) Follow the Leader" by Sielab – 4:50
 "Same Girl Different Wig" by Nick Faber – 6:12
 "Contemplation" by Lego – 4:58
 "Pepsi Tuckers Booty Beatdown" by Sie – 5:14

Disc two
 "In Pursuit of the Pimp Mobile" by Deadly Avenger – 7:15
 "3" (Back Door Mix) by Hyper Crad – 3:57
 "Twitchin'" by Tim "Love" Lee (featuring Chantilly Peach) – 4:31
 "Only If It Hurts" by Howie B. – 4:20
 "Pink Planet" by DJ Miku – 5:37
 "Favourite Final Geisha Show" by Chari Chari Chari – 2:28
 "Jeffrey Poindexter's Maximum Load" by Spacer – 4:12
 "Cum Dancing" by Inevidence – 5:43
 "Jenny Cum Lately" by Naked Funk – 11:24

References

External links
 

1998 compilation albums
Albums produced by Howie B